Kanchana Union is a Union of Satkania Upazila in the Division of Chittagong, Bangladesh.

Area
The Union total area is 13.53 km2 or 5.22 sq mile

Population 
As of 2011, the union total population is 21,275. Male is 10,164 and female is 11,411.

Location and boundaries   
Kanchana Union is located in the western part of Satkania Upazila. The distance from this union to Upazila Sadar is about 15 kilometers. It is bounded on the north by Charoti Union and Amilaish Union, on the east by Amilaish Union and Eochia Union, on the south by Eochia Union and on the west by Eochia Union and Sadhanpur Union of Banshkhali Upazila.

Naming and history 
It is said that in ancient times, the village was attracted by its natural beauty, economic prosperity and the abode of spiritual pursuits. They wanted to buy the village from the people of the village at the price of kanchan. Bengali kanchan means gold. But the villagers did not want to hand over the freedom in exchange for Kanchan or gold. On the one hand, the Auliya saints want to pay Kanchan as the price of the village and on the other hand, the people of the village do not respond, Bengali means "Na". Finally, Kanchan and Na merge with Kanchana.

Administrative area 
Kanchana Union is 4th union of Satkania Upazila. The union Administrative activities are under Satkania police station. It is part of Jatiya Sangsads 292 constituency Chittagong-15. It consists of Kanchana mouza. The villages of this union are: 
 South Kanchana 
 Middle Kanchana 
 North Kanchana

Education system  
Kanchana Union has a literacy rate of 49.31%,
The union has 3 secondary schools, 3 madrasas and 9 primary schools.

Educational institution
Madrasa
 Kanchana Anwarul Ulum Islamia Alia Madrasa
 South Kanchana Shah Rashidia Islamia Dhakil Madrasa
 Darul Ihsan Women Dhakil Madrasa

Secondary school  
 Amilaisha Kanchana Bonga Chandra Ghosh Institute  
 Kanchana Women High School  
 South Kanchana Nur Ahmed Chowdhury High School

Primary School 
 North Kanchana Kamal Uddin Government Primary School    
 North Kanchana Government Primary School
 Kanchana A I Government Primary School
 Kanchana Palpara Government Primary School
 Kanchana Women Primary School   
 Kanchana Government Primary School
 South Kanchana Gurguri  Government Primary School
 Bokshirkhil Model Government Primary School
 Middle Kanchana Government Primary School

Religious places 
Kanchana Union has 18 mosques, 5 Eidgahs and 5 temples.

Canals and rivers  
The Gaharchari Canal, Burachari Canal and Eochia Chara Canal are flowing over Kanchana Union.

Places of interest  
 Traditional Kazi Jame Mosque

Notable residents
 Alamgir Muhammad Serajuddin - Ekushey Padak recipient and Bangladeshi academic.
 Asif Iqbal - Bangladeshi lyricist and composer.
 B. M. Faizur Rahman - Bangladeshi politician and freedom fighter

Chairman 
 Present chairman: Ramjan Ali
List of all Chairman

See also
Madarsha Union
Eochia Union

References

Unions of Satkania Upazila